The term "food swamps" refers to urban environments with few grocery stores but several non-nutritious food options such as corner stores or fast-food restaurants, with a general ratio of four unhealthy options for each healthy option. Food swamps have positive, statistically significant effects on adult obesity rates, especially in areas where a majority of residents do not have access to personal or public transportation, and have disproportionate health impact on low-income minorities. This environment is found in areas with strong corporate or industrial influence and is becoming a global phenomenon. To eliminate food swamps, the introduction of policies which limit the amount of fast-food establishments and incentivize the distribution of healthy food options in an area is proposed.

Influence on human health 
Research suggests a positive correlation between obesity rates and the ratio of unhealthy to healthy food options. This is a consequence of fast-food options available in food swamps containing a high number of calories but a lower number of nutrients. Some data also suggests that young adults living in close proximity to fast-food restaurants demonstrated higher incidence of type 2 diabetes.

Environmental influence 
Corporate and industrial food systems lead to a variety of negative influences on the environment by contributing to water pollution, soil erosion, and biodiversity loss, as well as by increasing greenhouse gas emissions from the livestock industry. These influences can then have an associative effect on humans by damaging the environment and increasing the amount of present contaminants.

Racial/ethnic and socioeconomic influence 
Out of 12 conducted studies, the results of 10 provided evidence that in the US fast-food restaurants are more likely to be located in areas with higher concentrations of ethnic minorities than whites. Racial-ethnic and low-income minorities were shown to more frequently reside near unhealthy fast-food retailers than others. This suggests that racial-ethnic low-income minorities are more likely to experience the detrimental health effects of food swamps, which is supported by the fact that African Americans and Latinos have higher obesity rates than whites.

Controversy of term 
The term “food swamp” has endured some criticism on account of its referral to wetlands with a negative connotation. Critics have raised the point that while swamps have positive influences on ecosystems such as by detoxifying water and supporting biodiversity, food swamps exclusively cause problems for human health and the environment.

Proposed solutions 
To resolve the issues caused by food swamps, researchers have suggested that local governments should introduce policies such as new zoning laws that limit the number of possible unhealthy food outlets and incentivize the presence of healthy food retailers. Lowering obesity rates is not dependent on the elimination of fast-food options but rather a more equal rate of unhealthy to healthy food options. The Food Trust is an American nonprofit group that works to eliminate food swamps by ensuring access to food that is affordable and nutritious as well as by supporting programs which encourage SNAP recipients to buy healthy food.

References 

Society